Satya Bandyopadhyay (1925 – 28 July 1997) was an Indian actor, known for his work in Bengali cinema and theatre. He acted in over 300 movies, in numerous plays and performed frequently on the radio.

Early life 
He was born at Kolkata in the year 1925. His parents were Banamali and Charushila. His mother died at a young age. His father also died when he was a teenager. After completing college education from City College, Kolkata, he took up a job at Titagarh paper mill. At this time he was known for his sporting skills on football ground and badminton courts.

Acting in theatre 
His acting career started with acting in amateur clubs. Birendra Krishna Bhadra helped him get roles in plays on All India Radio. His first major role was 'Shaheeder Daak', a Gananatya production. He acted in multiple roles in major plays such as Ulka, Saheb Bibi Golam, Adarsha Hindu Hotel, Chowringee, Begum Mary Biswas, Asami Hajir, Manjari Opera and Devi Choudhurani.

He started writing plays and act in them. Most of these plays were very popular, such as Sesh theke shuru, Erao Manush and Nagpash. His most notable play was Nahabat which was a blockbuster of its time. His acting skill in theatre were revered by many prominent contemporary directors and actors. Along with his friend Tarun Kumar Chatterjee, they established Uttam Mancha, a theatre dedicated to Tarun's elder brother and great actor Uttam Kumar.

Acting in movies 
His acting career started in late 1940s as a hero in few Bengali movies. Later he established himself as a character artist and became an automatic choice in comedy movies. He has also worked in villainous roles with equal ease. Most famous of those were Charmurti, where he played the iconic character of Ghutghutananda, a role of a criminal with rib tickling lines.

Many great directors such as Satyajit Ray and Mrinal Sen worked with him. His most memorable association was with director Tarun Majumdar with whom he worked in multiple movies.

Selected filmography

References 

1925 births
1997 deaths
20th-century Indian actors
20th-century Bengalis
Recipients of the Sangeet Natak Akademi Award